The Massachusetts State Deputy of the Knights of Columbus is the highest official in the Knights of Columbus within the Commonwealth of Massachusetts.

Notes

References

Works cited

Knights of Columbus
State Deputies of the Knights of Columbus